Jeremy Rebek (born February 10, 1976) is a Canadian-born Austrian former professional ice hockey defenceman.

Playing career
Rebek first moved to the Austrian Hockey League (also known as the Erste Bank Eishockey Liga or EBEL) in 2003 with the Graz 99ers. He remained for three seasons which also included a brief spell in Switzerland for HC Ambri-Piotta. He also became eligible to represent Austria in international competitions. He later had spells with EC KAC, EC Red Bull Salzburg and the Vienna Capitals.

On July 27, 2011, the Belfast Giants announced that they had signed Rebek as a free agent for the 2010–11 season. He was made the team's captain during that season. He then moved to Italy joining Asiago Hockey 1935 of the Serie A but only played three games for the team before retiring during his 17th professional season.

References

External links

1976 births
Living people
Asiago Hockey 1935 players
Austrian ice hockey defencemen
Belfast Giants players
Chicago Wolves players
EC Red Bull Salzburg players
Graz 99ers players
HC Ambrì-Piotta players
Ice hockey people from Ontario
Kansas City Blades players
EC KAC players
Milwaukee Admirals players
Mississippi Sea Wolves players
Missouri River Otters players
Owen Sound Platers players
Rockford IceHogs (UHL) players
Sportspeople from Sault Ste. Marie, Ontario
Toledo Storm players
Vienna Capitals players
EK Zell am See players
Canadian ice hockey defencemen
Naturalised citizens of Austria
Canadian expatriate ice hockey players in the United States
Canadian expatriate ice hockey players in Austria
Canadian expatriate ice hockey players in Germany
Canadian expatriate ice hockey players in Switzerland
Canadian expatriate ice hockey players in Northern Ireland
Canadian expatriate ice hockey players in Italy
Austrian expatriate sportspeople in Italy
Austrian expatriate sportspeople in Northern Ireland
Austrian expatriate sportspeople in Switzerland
Austrian expatriate sportspeople in the United States
Canadian ice hockey coaches
Austrian ice hockey coaches
Austrian expatriate ice hockey people